Joy Schoonhoven (born 27 April 1994) is a Dutch former professional footballer who played as a winger. He made his Eerste Divisie league debut with Almere City FC during the 2011–12 season.

References

External links
 

1994 births
Living people
Dutch footballers
Association football wingers
Eerste Divisie players
Almere City FC players
Place of birth missing (living people)